{{DISPLAYTITLE:C14H8O5}}
The molecular formula C14H8O5 (molar mass: 256.21 g/mol, exact mass: 256.037173) may refer to:

 Anthrapurpurin, a purple dye used in histology
 1,2,4-Trihydroxyanthraquinone, aka Purpurin, an anthraquinone dye
 1,3,8-Trihydroxyanthraquinone